Dastak is a village in Dehgah Rural District, Kiashahr District, Astaneh-ye Ashrafiyeh County, Gilan Province, Iran. At the 2006 census, its population was 2,015, in 611 families.

References 

Populated places in Astaneh-ye Ashrafiyeh County